Çakırkaya is a village in the Pülümür District, Tunceli Province, Turkey. The village is populated by Kurds of the Bamasur tribe and had a population of 35 in 2021.

References 

Kurdish settlements in Tunceli Province
Villages in Pülümür District